Richard Anthony Allen (March 8, 1942 – December 7, 2020) was an American professional baseball player. During his fifteen-year-long Major League Baseball (MLB) career, he played as a first baseman, third baseman, and outfielder, most notably for the Philadelphia Phillies and Chicago White Sox, and was one of baseball's top sluggers of the 1960s and early 1970s.

Allen was named an All-Star seven times. He began his career as a Phillie by being selected 1964 National League (NL) Rookie of the Year and in 1972 was the American League (AL) Most Valuable Player with the Chicago White Sox. He led the AL in home runs twice; the NL in slugging percentage once and the AL twice; and each major league in on-base percentage once apiece. Allen's career .534 slugging percentage was among his era's highest in an age of comparatively modest offensive production.

Allen's brothers played baseball as well. His older brother, Hank, was an outfielder for three AL teams; his younger brother, Ron, briefly played first base for the 1972 St. Louis Cardinals.

He fell one vote short of election each time, receiving 11 votes from 16-member committees, when 75% (12 votes) is the threshold for election.

Allen was inducted into the Baseball Reliquary's Shrine of the Eternals in 2004. The Philadelphia Phillies retired Allen's uniform number 15 on September 3, 2020.

MLB career

Philadelphia Phillies
Phillies scout John Ogden convinced the Phillies to sign Allen in 1960 for a $70,000 bonus. Ogden had played for the International League Baltimore Orioles from 1919 to 1925, under Jack Dunn, the discoverer of Babe Ruth; Ogden later pitched against Ruth in the American League (AL). Ogden stated in a Philadelphia Bulletin story printed on July 1, 1969, that Allen was the only player he ever saw who hit a ball as hard as Ruth.

Allen faced racial harassment while playing for the Phillies' minor league affiliate in Little Rock; residents sent death threats to Allen, the local team's first black player.

His first full season in the majors, 1964, ranks among the greatest rookie seasons ever. He led the league in runs (125), triples (13), extra base hits (80), and total bases (352); Allen finished in the top five in batting average (.318), slugging average (.557), hits (201), and doubles (38) and won Rookie of the Year. Playing for the first time at third base, he led the league with 41 errors. Along with outfielder Johnny Callison and pitchers Chris Short and Jim Bunning, Allen led the Phillies to a six-and-a-half game hold on first place with 12 games to play in an exceptionally strong National League. The 1964 Phillies then lost ten straight games and finished tied for second place. The Phillies lost the first game of the streak to the Cincinnati Reds when Chico Ruiz stole home with Frank Robinson batting for the game's only run. In Allen's autobiography (written with Tim Whitaker), Crash: The Life and Times of Dick Allen, Allen stated that the play "broke our humps". Despite the Phillies' collapse, Allen hit .438 with 5 doubles, 2 triples, 3 home runs and 11 RBI in those last 12 games.

Allen hit a two-run home run off the Cubs' Larry Jackson on May 29, 1965 that cleared the Coke sign on Connie Mack Stadium's left-center field roof. That home run, an estimated 529-footer, inspired Willie Stargell to say: "Now I know why they (the Phillies fans) boo Richie all the time. When he hits a home run, there's no souvenir."

While playing for Philadelphia, Allen appeared on several All-Star teams including the 1965–67 teams (in the latter of these three games, he hit a home run off Dean Chance). He led the league in slugging (.632), OPS (1.027) and extra base hits (75) in 1966.

Non-baseball incidents soon marred Allen's Philadelphia career. In July 1965, he got into a fistfight with fellow Phillie Frank Thomas. According to two teammates who witnessed the fight, Thomas swung a bat at Allen, hitting him in the shoulder. Johnny Callison said, "Thomas got himself fired when he swung that bat at Richie. In baseball you don't swing a bat at another player—ever." Pat Corrales confirmed that Thomas hit Allen with a bat and added that Thomas was a "bully" known for making racially divisive remarks. Allen and his teammates were not permitted to give their side of the story under threat of a heavy fine. The Phillies released Thomas the next day. That not only made the fans and local sports writers see Allen as costing a white player his job, but freed Thomas to give his version of the fight. In an hour-long interview aired December 15, 2009, on the MLB Network's Studio 42 with Bob Costas, Allen asserted that he and Thomas had since become good friends.

Allen's name was a source of controversy: he had been known since his youth as "Dick" to family and friends, but the media referred to him upon his arrival in Philadelphia as "Richie". After leaving the Phillies, he asked to be called "Dick", saying Richie was a little boy's name. In his dual career as an R&B singer, the label on his records with the Groovy Grooves firm slated him as "Rich" Allen.

Some Phillies fans, known for being tough on hometown players even in the best of times, exacerbated Allen's problems. Initially the abuse was verbal, with obscenities and racial epithets. Eventually Allen was greeted with showers of fruit, ice, refuse, and even flashlight batteries as he took the field. He began wearing his batting helmet even while playing his position in the field, which gave rise to another nickname, "Crash Helmet", shortened to "Crash".

He almost ended his career in 1967 after mangling his throwing hand by pushing it through a car headlight. Allen was fined $2,500 and suspended indefinitely in 1969 when he failed to appear for the Phillies twi-night doubleheader game with the New York Mets. Allen had gone to New Jersey in the morning to see a horse race, and got caught in traffic trying to return.

St. Louis Cardinals and Los Angeles Dodgers
Allen finally had enough, and demanded the Phillies trade him. They sent him to the Cardinals in a trade before the 1970 season. Even this deal caused controversy, though not of Allen's making, since Cardinals outfielder Curt Flood refused to report to the Phillies as part of the trade. (Flood then sued baseball in an unsuccessful attempt to overthrow the reserve clause and to be declared a free agent.) Coincidentally, the player the Phillies received as compensation for Flood not reporting, Willie Montañez, hit 30 home runs as a 1971 rookie to eclipse Allen's Phillies rookie home run record of 29, set in 1964. Allen earned another All-Star berth in St. Louis.

Decades before Mark McGwire, Dick Allen entertained the St. Louis fans with some long home runs, at least one of them landing in the seats above the club level in left field. Nevertheless, the Cardinals traded Allen to the Los Angeles Dodgers before the 1971 season for 1969 NL Rookie of the Year Ted Sizemore and young catcher Bob Stinson. Allen had a relatively quiet season in 1971 although he hit .295 for the Dodgers.

Chicago White Sox
Allen was acquired by the White Sox from the Dodgers for Tommy John and Steve Huntz at the Winter Meetings on December 2, 1971. For various reasons, his previous managers had shuffled him around on defense, playing him at first base, third base, and the outfield in no particular order – a practice which almost certainly weakened his defensive play, and which may have contributed to his frequent injuries, not to mention his perceived bad attitude. Sox manager Chuck Tanner's low-key style of handling ballplayers made it possible for Allen to thrive, for a while, on the South Side. Tanner decided to play Allen exclusively at first base, which allowed him to concentrate on hitting. That first year, his first in the American League (AL), Allen almost single-handedly lifted the entire team to second place in the AL West, as he led the league in home runs (37) (setting a team record), RBI (113), walks (99), on-base percentage (.420), slugging percentage (.603), and OPS (1.023), while winning a well-deserved MVP award. However, the Sox fell short at the end and finished  games behind the World Series–bound Oakland Athletics.

Allen's feats during his years with the White Sox – particularly in that MVP season of 1972 – are spoken of reverently by South Side fans who credit him with saving the franchise for Chicago (it was rumored to be bound for St. Petersburg or Seattle at the time). His powerful swing sent home runs deep into some of cavernous old Comiskey Park's farthest reaches, including the roof and even the distant center field bleachers, a rare feat at one of baseball's most pitcher-friendly stadiums. On July 31, 1972, Allen became the first player in baseball's "modern era" to hit two inside-the-park home runs in one game. Both homers were hit off Bert Blyleven in the White Sox' 8–1 victory over the Minnesota Twins at Metropolitan Stadium. Anecdotal and mathematical evidence agreed that Allen's clout would've easily surpassed  on the fly.

The Sox were favored by many to make the playoffs in 1973, but those hopes were dashed due in large measure to the fractured fibula that Allen suffered in June. (He tried to return five weeks after injuring the leg in a collision with Mike Epstein of the California Angels, but the pain ended Allen's season after just one game in which he batted 3-for-5.) In 1974, despite his making the AL All-Star team in each of the three years with the Sox, Allen's stay in Chicago ended in controversy when he left the team on September 14 with two weeks left in the season. In his autobiography, Allen blamed his feud with third-baseman Ron Santo, who was playing a final, undistinguished season with the White Sox after leaving the crosstown Chicago Cubs.

With Allen's intention to continue playing baseball uncertain, the White Sox reluctantly sold his contract to the Atlanta Braves for only $5,000, despite the fact that he had led the league in home runs, slugging (.563), and OPS (.938). Allen refused to report to the Braves and announced his retirement.

Return to the Phillies
The Phillies managed to coax Allen out of retirement for the 1975 season.  The lay-off and nagging effects of his broken leg in 1973 hampered his play. His numbers improved in 1976, a Phillies division winner, as he hit 15 home runs and batted .268 in 85 games. He continued his tape measure legacy during his second go-round with the Phillies. On August 22, 1975, Allen smashed a homer into the seldom reached upper deck at San Diego Stadium, as the Phillies eventually beat the Padres 6-5.

Oakland Athletics
Allen played in 54 games and hit five home runs with 31 RBI with a .240 batting average during his final season, for the Oakland Athletics in 1977 before leaving the team abruptly in June of that season. His final day as a player was on June 19, playing both games of a doubleheader, against the White Sox. In five total plate appearances, he had two hits, with his final hit being a single in the eighth inning.

MLB statistics
Allen's major league stats:

Music career 
Dick Allen sang professionally in a high, delicate tenor. The tone and texture of his voice has drawn comparisons to Harptones' lead singer Willie Winfield. During Allen's time with the Sixties-era Phillies, he sang lead with a doo-wop group called The Ebonistics. "Rich Allen and The Ebonistics" sang professionally at Philadelphia night clubs. He once entertained during halftime of a Philadelphia 76ers basketball game. The Philadelphia Inquirer printed a review of his performance:

Although his music career was not as substantial or long-lasting as that of Milwaukee Braves outfielder Arthur Lee Maye, Allen gained lasting praise for recording a 45 single on the Groovey Grooves label (160-A, "Rich Allen and the Ebonistics") titled "Echo's of November" (misspelled Echoes) which was released in 1968. The song name is featured in the Phillies official hundred-year anniversary video and the novel '64 Intruder. In 2010, Brazilian pop star Ana Volans rerecorded Echoes of November; her rendition sold briskly in Brazil, and the CD's jacket contains a dedication to Dick Allen and his Hall of Fame candidacy).

Hall of Fame candidacy

Background
Sabermetrician Bill James rated Dick Allen as the second-most controversial player in baseball history, behind Rogers Hornsby.  James called Allen's autobiography, Crash, "one of the best baseball books in recent years." Allen had the highest slugging percentage among players eligible for but not in the National Baseball Hall of Fame until Albert Belle became eligible in 2006.

Barra wrote that a "growing body of baseball historians think that Dick Allen is the best player eligible for the Hall of Fame." The arguments usually center around his very high career averages, batting (.292), slugging (.534), and on-base (.378). They also state that he began his career during the mid-1960s, a period so dominated by pitchers that it is sometimes called the "second dead ball era." Of the major league batters with 500 or more career home runs whose play intersected Dick Allen's career at the beginning or end, only Mickey Mantle's lifetime OPS+ of 172 topped Dick Allen's lifetime 156 OPS+. Allen also played some of his career in pitcher-friendly parks such as Busch Memorial Stadium, Dodger Stadium, and Comiskey Park.

In addition to hitting for high offensive percentages, Allen displayed prodigious power. Before scientific weight training, muscle-building dietary supplements, and anabolic steroids, Allen boasted a muscular physique along the lines of Mickey Mantle and Jimmie Foxx. Baseball historian Bill Jenkinson ranks Allen with Foxx and Mantle, and just a notch below Babe Ruth, as the four top long-distance sluggers ever to wield a baseball bat. A segment of MLB Network's Prime 9 concurred with Jenkinson's findings. On that same broadcast, Willie Mays stated that Allen hit a ball harder than any player he had ever seen. Dick Allen, like Babe Ruth, hit with a rather heavy bat. Allen's 40-ounce bat bucked the Ted Williams-inspired trend of using a light bat for increased bat speed. Allen combined massive strength and body torque to produce bat speed and drive the ball. Two of his drives cleared Connie Mack Stadium's 65-foot-high left-field grandstand. Allen also cleared that park's 65-foot-high right-center field scoreboard twice, a feat considered virtually impossible for a right-handed hitter.

Detractors of Allen's Hall of Fame credentials argue that his career was not as long as most Hall of Famers, and therefore lacked the career cumulative numbers that others do. They further argue that the controversies surrounding him negatively impacted his teams.

Hall of Fame player Willie Stargell countered with a historical perspective of Dick Allen's time: "Dick Allen played the game in the most conservative era in baseball history. It was a time of change and protest in the country, and baseball reacted against all that. They saw it as a threat to the game. The sportswriters were reactionary too. They didn't like seeing a man of such extraordinary skills doing it his way. It made them nervous. Dick Allen was ahead of his time. His views and way of doing things would go unnoticed today. If I had been manager of the Phillies back when he was playing, I would have found a way to make Dick Allen comfortable. I would have told him to blow off the writers. It was my observation that when Dick Allen was comfortable, balls left the park."

The two managers for whom Allen played the longest – Gene Mauch of the Phillies, and Chuck Tanner of the White Sox – agreed with Willie Stargell that Allen was not a "clubhouse lawyer" who harmed team chemistry. Asked if Allen's behavior ever had a negative influence on the team, Mauch said, "Never. Dick's teammates always liked him. I'd take him in a minute." According to Tanner, "Dick was the leader of our team, the captain, the manager on the field. He took care of the young kids, took them under his wing. And he played every game as if it was his last day on earth."

Hall of Fame player Orlando Cepeda agreed, saying to author Tim Whitaker, "Dick Allen played with fire in his eyes."

Hall of Fame teammate Goose Gossage also confirmed Tanner's view. In an interview with USA TODAY Sports, Gossage said: "I've been around the game a long time, and he's the greatest player I've ever seen play in my life. He had the most amazing season (1972) I've ever seen. He's the smartest baseball man I've ever been around in my life. He taught me how to pitch from a hitter's perspective, and taught me how to play the game right. There's no telling the numbers this guy could have put up if all he worried about was stats. The guy belongs in the Hall of Fame."

Another of Allen's ex-White Sox teammates, pitcher Stan Bahnsen, said, "I actually thought that Dick was better than his stats. Every time we needed a clutch hit, he got it. He got along great with his teammates and he was very knowledgeable about the game. He was the ultimate team guy."

Another Hall of Fame teammate, Mike Schmidt, credited Dick Allen in his book, Clearing the Bases, as his mentor. In Schmidt's biography, written by historian William C. Kashatus, Schmidt fondly recalls Allen mentoring him before a game in Chicago in 1976, saying to him, "Mike, you've got to relax. You've got to have some fun. Remember when you were just a kid and you'd skip supper to play ball? You were having fun. Hey, with all the talent you've got, baseball ought to be fun. Enjoy it. Be a kid again." Schmidt responded by hitting four home runs in the game. 
Schmidt is quoted in the same book, "The baseball writers used to claim that Dick would divide the clubhouse along racial lines. That was a lie. The truth is that Dick never divided any clubhouse."

BBWAA consideration
Allen was included in 1983 Baseball Hall of Fame balloting for consideration by the Baseball Writers' Association of America (BBWAA). He received 14 votes out of the 374 ballots cast (3.7%). Since his vote total was less than 5%, he was removed from future consideration by BBWAA voters.

Committee consideration
In 2010, the Baseball Hall of Fame established a Golden Era Committee (one of several new committees replacing the prior Veterans Committee), to vote on the possible Hall of Fame induction of previously overlooked candidates who played between 1947 and 1972. Beginning in December 2011, this 16-member committee voted every three years on 10 nominated candidates from the era, selected by the BBWAA's Historical Overview Committee. Allen was first considered in December 2014 (for the class of ). Allen and former outfielder Tony Oliva both fell one vote short of the 12 required votes, as no one was elected by the committee.

In 2016, the Golden Era Committee was replaced by the Golden Days Committee (1950–1969) to vote on 10 candidates beginning in December 2020 (for the class of 2021). In August 2020, the Hall of Fame rescheduled the committee's first winter meeting voting to December 2021 (for the class of ), due to the COVID-19 pandemic. On December 5, 2021, results of Golden Days Committee voting was released; Allen again fell one vote short of election, garnering 11 votes from the 16-member committee and proponents for his election will have to wait until December 2026.

Death
Allen died at his home in Wampum, Pennsylvania, on December 7, 2020, at age 78.

See also

 Chicagoland Sports Hall of Fame
 List of Major League Baseball career home run leaders
 List of Major League Baseball career runs scored leaders
 List of Major League Baseball career runs batted in leaders
 List of Major League Baseball annual runs batted in leaders
 List of Major League Baseball annual home run leaders
 List of Major League Baseball annual runs scored leaders
 List of Major League Baseball annual triples leaders

References

Further reading

Articles
 Keith, Larry (May 19, 1975). "Philadelphia Story: Act II; Mercurial Dick Allen returns to the city where he began his career, saying 'I'd like to think I've grown up.' Suddenly, pennant talk is rampant". Sports Illustrated.
 Kiersh, Edward (April 13, 1983). "His Inner Turmoil Was Allen's Toughest Adversary". The Philadelphia Inquirer.

Books
 Kashatus, William C. (2004). September Swoon: Richie Allen, the 1964 Phillies and Racial Integration. University Park: Pennsylvania State University Press.
 Kashatus, William C. (2017). Dick Allen: The Life and Times of A Baseball Immortal, An Illustrated Biography.  Lancaster, PA: Schiffer Books. 
 Nathanson, Mitchell (2016). God Almighty Hisself: The Life and Legacy of Dick Allen. Philadelphia: University of Pennsylvania Press.

External links

Dick Allen at SABR (Baseball BioProject)
Dick Allen at Baseball Almanac
Dick Allen at Baseball Gauge
Dick Allen at Baseballbiography.com

1942 births
2020 deaths
20th-century American singers
African-American baseball players
20th-century African-American male singers
American League All-Stars
American League Most Valuable Player Award winners
American League RBI champions
American League home run champions
American memoirists
Arkansas Travelers players
Baseball players from Philadelphia
Chicago White Sox players
Elmira Pioneers players
Los Angeles Dodgers players
Magic Valley Cowboys players
Major League Baseball Rookie of the Year Award winners
Major League Baseball first basemen
Major League Baseball third basemen
Musicians from Philadelphia
National League All-Stars
Oakland Athletics players
People from Lawrence County, Pennsylvania
Philadelphia Phillies players
St. Louis Cardinals players
Williamsport Grays players
20th-century American male singers
21st-century African-American people